Broadway Plaza is an outdoor shopping mall located in downtown Walnut Creek. The shopping center opened on October 11, 1951 and is owned and operated by Macerich. The mall is anchored by Nordstrom and Macy's, and features nearly 80 stores including Crate & Barrel, flagship H&M and ZARA stores, a standalone Apple store with an adjoining outdoor plaza, an Industrious co-working space, a planned Pinstripes entertainment center and restaurant, and a planned Life Time Fitness sports club.

History

Broadway Plaza opened on October 18, 1951 with 38 stores. JCPenney, Sears, Woolworths, Joseph Magnin (later I. Magnin), and a Lucky Supermarket were the mall's original anchors. In 1954, Oakland-based department store Capwell's opened as the center's fifth anchor.

Lucky was replaced by Northern California's second Bullock's department store in 1973, which was in turn converted to Nordstrom in 1984.

Capwell's became Emporium-Capwell in 1979, and was converted to Macy's in 1995; while I.Magnin was converted to a separate Macy's Men's store that same year. A renovation occurred at the property in the early 1990s, adding a unified architectural and landscaping scheme to the property when it previously had none. Crate & Barrel opened a two-level store at the property in 1992. A former parking lot adjacent to Crate & Barrel was replaced with a pedestrian plaza in 1994, with a fountain, a retail building, and a stand-alone California Pizza Kitchen restaurant. Finally, a new, multi-floor parking structure was built in the southwest corner of the property behind the Macy's Men's store. 

After a protracted legal battle, a Neiman Marcus department store opened at the property in 2012, the first of several major changed to occur at the property. The expansion consolidated the two Macy's stores into the former Women's store building, which was expanded and remodeled, and replaced the former single-level retail space and parking structure between Macy's and Nordstrom with a two-level retail building and multi-level parking structure. The first tenants in the expansion opened in September 2016, while additional tenants and a two-level Zara store (located on a partial portion of the land once home to the Macy's Men's store) opened for business during the Christmas shopping season. 

California Pizza Kitchen moved elsewhere in the city in 2016, with tenants of the adjacent stand-alone building moving into the mall's expansion wing that same year. A new stand-alone Apple store and a revitalized pedestrian plaza were then proposed for the land occupied by the two vacant buildings. Apple and the new plaza commenced construction in early 2017, and opened in Summer of 2018. Life Time Fitness, an upscale large-format sports club, began construction on the remainder of the former Macy's Men's footprint in 2021 after a series of delays related to the COVID-19 pandemic, with a planned opening in 2023.

On May 31, 2020, amidst the George Floyd protests, several stores at the center were looted. 

In mid-2020, Neiman Marcus announced it would close its Walnut Creek store as part of a bankruptcy filing. Neiman Marcus closed in January of 2021, and the building sat vacant until the following year when Crate & Barrel temporarily moved into the space. The former Crate & Barrel store would then be converted to Pinstripes, a hybrid restaurant/bowling alley entertainment concept, scheduled to open in 2023.

References

External links
 Broadway Plaza Homepage

Contra Costa County, California
Macerich
Walnut Creek, California
Shopping malls in the San Francisco Bay Area
Shopping malls established in 1951
1951 establishments in California